Dušan Marković may refer to:
 Dušan Marković (footballer, born 1906)
 Dušan Marković (footballer, born 1998)
 Dušan Marković (water polo)